Lucius Cassius Longinus may refer to:

Romans
Lucius Cassius Longinus (consul 30)
Lucius Cassius Longinus (proconsul 48 BC)
 Lucius Cassius Longinus (praetor 66 BC), and part of the Second Catilinarian conspiracy
Lucius Cassius Longinus (tribune 105 BC)
Lucius Cassius Longinus (consul 107 BC)
Lucius Cassius Longinus Ravilla, a Roman consul in 127 BC

See also
Cassius Longinus (disambiguation)